WASP-64 is a star about 1200 light-years away. It is a G7 class main-sequence star, orbited by a planet WASP-64b. It is younger than the Sun at 3.6 billion years, and it has a metal abundance similar to the Sun. The star is rotating rapidly, being spun up by the giant planet in a close orbit.

WASP-64 was named Atakoraka in 2019 after the Atacora, the largest mountain range in Togo. An imaging survey in 2017 failed to find any stellar companions.

Planetary system
A transiting hot Jupiter exoplanet orbiting WASP-64 was discovered by WASP in 2012. The planetary equilibrium temperature is 1672 K, while the measured dayside temperature is hotter at 1989 K. Due to the close proximity of the planet to the parent star, orbital decay of WASP-64b, along with HATS-2, may be detectable in the near future. WASP-64b was named Agouto (after Mount Agou, the highest point of Togo which lies within the Atacora chain) in 2019 by amateur astronomers from Togo as part of the NameExoWorlds contest.

References

G-type main-sequence stars
Planetary systems with one confirmed planet
Planetary transit variables
Canis Major
J06442760-3251302